Julius Henry Fournier (August 8, 1865 – December 8, 1945) was a pitcher in Major League Baseball. He played for the Cincinnati Reds in 1894.

References

External links

1865 births
1945 deaths
Major League Baseball pitchers
Cincinnati Reds players
Baseball players from Syracuse, New York
19th-century baseball players
Utica Braves players
Mansfield (minor league baseball) players
Denver Mountaineers players
Omaha Lambs players
New Haven Nutmegs players
Syracuse Stars (minor league baseball) players
Utica Stars players
Buffalo Bisons (minor league) players
Reading Actives players
Albany Senators players
Binghamton Bingoes players
Easton Dutchmen players
Pawtucket Maroons players
Brockton Shoemakers players
Gloversville Glovers players
Toronto Canucks players
Johnstown Mormans players
Palmyra Mormans players
Rome Romans players